Efetobore Eric “Efe” Ambrose Emuobo (born 18 October 1988) is a Nigerian professional footballer who plays as a defender for Greenock Morton. Ambrose has previously played for Kaduna United, Bayelsa United, Israeli club Ashdod, Scottish clubs Celtic, Hibernian, Livingston, St Johnstone and Dunfermline Athletic, and English side Derby County.

Ambrose has also played for the Nigeria national football team, and he has represented Nigeria at the FIFA Under-20 World Cup, the Summer Olympics, the Africa Cup of Nations and the FIFA World Cup.

Club career

Early career
Ambrose started his professional career at Kaduna United in 2006 and two years later, he was loaned to Bayelsa United for the 2008–09 season but remained with Kaduna United after helping them win promotion.

FC Ashdod
Ambrose joined Israeli Premier League club FC Ashdod in June 2010 and left in 2012.

Celtic
Ambrose joined Scottish Premier League club Celtic in the summer 2012 transfer deadline day, signing a three-year contract. After joining the club, Ambrose praised his new teammates at Celtic for helping him settle down in Glasgow quickly.  Ambrose also revealed he studied British football in order to join Celtic by watching both Scottish Premier League and English Premier League games on TV upon hearing about Celtic's interest in him.

Ambrose made his debut on 22 September 2012 as a substitute for Celtic captain Scott Brown against Dundee in the Scottish Premier League, a 2–0 victory. He made his full début against Raith Rovers in the Scottish League Cup, in a 4–1 victory. He scored his first goal for Celtic in a 5–0 win over St Mirren on 20 October 2012, celebrating the goal with a quadruple somersault. Ambrose went on to make his Champions League debut for Celtic, where he played 90 minutes in a 3–2 win over Spartak Moscow. On 4 November 2012, Ambrose headed in an own goal, in a 2–2 draw against Dundee United. After the match, Ambrose said he let himself down and felt that he could have cleared the ball away. On 7 November 2012, ahead of a Champions League game against Barcelona, Ambrose made a vow to give his best ever performance for the club. After a stunning performance by the Celtic players, they won 2–1 and Ambrose said that winning against Barcelona was the 'perfect way to celebrate Celtic's 125th anniversary.

At the end of the Champions League group stage campaign, Celtic qualified for the knock-out stages and faced Italian side Juventus. In the first leg, Ambrose was named in the squad ahead of the match, only 3 days after Nigeria had won the Africa Cup of Nations, Ambrose had played the full 90 minutes in the final. However, Ambrose made several mistakes during the match, allowing Alessandro Matri (first goal) and Mirko Vučinić (third goal) to score with ease. He also missed the club's best chance to score late in the game. His performance was criticised by teammate Kris Commons. Though criticised, Ambrose was defended by Kelvin Wilson, who believed that Ambrose would bounce back from his disappointing performance. Ambrose made amends in the next league game when he scored Celtic's opener in a 6–2 win over Dundee United. Ambrose's (along with Commons) performance was praised by Neil Lennon. Three days later, he scored again, in a 1–1 draw against St Johnstone. Ahead of the second leg against Juventus, Ambrose said that Commons' criticism inspired him to become a better player. After the match, which Juventus won 2–0 and progressed to the quarter finals, Neil Lennon stated that Ambrose was late for training and missed the team bus from the hotel and was left to catch up by taxi. Lennon also stated that Ambrose needed to "sort himself out."

Ambrose came under strong criticism from fans and pundits alike for frequent poor performances and errors which led to opposition goals. On 31 August 2016, after becoming frozen out of the first-team at Celtic under new manager Brendan Rodgers, Celtic accepted a bid of £300,000 for Ambrose from Standard Liège, but the deal fell through after he opted to stay at Celtic Park. In February 2017, Ambrose's proposed loan move to Blackburn Rovers fell through, after the club was unable to obtain a work permit.

Hibernian
On 28 February 2017, Ambrose joined Hibernian on loan for the rest of the season. Ambrose scored his first goal for Hibs on 25 March, the opening goal of a 2–1 win in the Scottish Championship against Falkirk. He won the Scottish Championship player of the month award for March 2017.

After his contract with Celtic expired at the end of the season, Ambrose signed a two-year contract with Hibernian. Ambrose exercised a clause in his contract and left Hibernian in January 2019, despite the club offering him a new deal.

Derby County
In February 2019, Ambrose went on trial with EFL Championship club Derby County. Later that month he signed a short-term contract with the club.

He was released by Derby County at the end of the 2018–19 season.

Livingston
After several months without a club, Ambrose signed for Livingston in February 2020.

In May 2021, Ambrose was one of a few players who were released by Livingston at the end of the 2020–21 season.

St Johnstone
In September 2021, Ambrose signed with Scottish Premiership side St Johnstone.

Dunfermline
On 4 February 2022, Ambrose joined Scottish Championship side Dunfermline Athletic on loan until the end of the 2021–22 season.

Greenock Morton
Ambrose signed for Greenock Morton on 26 October 2022 in a deal until the end of the season.

International career
Ambrose was a member of the Nigeria national under-20 football team at 2007 FIFA U-20 World Cup in Canada. He later represented Nigeria U-23 and played two games at the 2008 Summer Olympics.

He was called up to Nigeria's 23-man squad for the 2013 Africa Cup of Nations. In the Africa Cup of Nations, Ambrose played five out of six games for Nigeria, playing in the right-back position, including the final which he started. After the tournament, Ambrose was named in the 2013 African Cup of Nations Team of the Tournament. Ambrose says winning the Africa Cup of Nations was his biggest achievement and one of the greatest moments of his life.

He was selected for Nigeria's squad at the 2013 FIFA Confederations Cup and the 2014 FIFA World Cup. Ambrose has not been selected since 2016, due to him losing his place at Celtic. He played regularly for Hibernian during the 2017–18 season, but was not recalled for the 2018 FIFA World Cup squad. This decision was criticised by former Nigeria manager Samson Siasia, who felt that Ambrose's experience would have been useful.

Style of play
Ambrose often played as a defensive midfielder for the Nigeria national football team and can also play as a centre back or right back, doing so in the Israeli Premier League at FC Ashdod. A ball playing centre-half, Efe is known for his composure in possession. He normally performs a somersault after scoring a goal.

Career statistics

Club

International appearances

International goals
Scores and results list Nigeria's goal tally first.

Honours
Bayelsa
 Nigerian Premier League: 2008–09

Kaduna United
 Nigerian FA Cup: 2010

Celtic
 Scottish Premiership: 2012–13, 2013–14, 2014–15, 2015–16
 Scottish Cup: 2012–13
 Scottish League Cup: 2014–15

Hibernian
Scottish Championship: 2016–17

Nigeria
 Africa Cup of Nations: 2013
Individual
UEFA Champions League Team of the Week: (Week 3, 2012–13)
Africa Cup of Nations Team of the Tournament: 2013

References

External links
I will score more goals for Eagles – Ambrose

1988 births
Living people
Sportspeople from Kaduna
Association football defenders
Association football fullbacks
Nigerian footballers
Nigeria international footballers
Nigeria under-20 international footballers
Footballers at the 2008 Summer Olympics
Olympic footballers of Nigeria
Olympic silver medalists for Nigeria
Kaduna United F.C. players
Bayelsa United F.C. players
F.C. Ashdod players
Celtic F.C. players
Hibernian F.C. players
Scottish Premier League players
Scottish Professional Football League players
Israeli Premier League players
Olympic medalists in football
Nigerian expatriate footballers
Expatriate footballers in Israel
Expatriate footballers in Scotland
2013 Africa Cup of Nations players
Medalists at the 2008 Summer Olympics
2013 FIFA Confederations Cup players
2014 FIFA World Cup players
Nigerian expatriate sportspeople in Israel
Nigerian expatriate sportspeople in Scotland
Nigerian expatriate sportspeople in England
Africa Cup of Nations-winning players
Derby County F.C. players
Expatriate footballers in England
Livingston F.C. players
St Johnstone F.C. players
Dunfermline Athletic F.C. players
Greenock Morton F.C. players